Laurence Gibson (born March 19, 1991) is a former American football offensive tackle. He played college football at Virginia Tech. He was drafted by the Dallas Cowboys in the seventh round of the 2015 NFL draft.

Early years
Gibson attended Buena High School, where he played two seasons as an offensive lineman and defensive end. He finished with over 100 tackles, 27 sacks, and 12 forced fumbles. He received 0 scholarship offers after graduating from Buena High School in 2009. Fall 2009, he attended Hargrave Military Academy and moved to offensive tackle. He became the number 1 offensive tackle and number 2 overall player in the United States (rivals.com). He received over 30 scholarship offers from NCAA Division I and Division II schools during his time at Hargrave Military Academy.

On December 17, 2009, at Hargrave Military Academy, he accepted an athletic scholarship to Virginia Tech and began his college career in January 2010. He initially started his college football career moving between guard and tackle. He settled at backup right tackle as a sophomore and played mostly on special teams, which he would continue to play for the remainder of his college career. Junior year, Gibson posted 6 starts at right tackle. He became the regular starter at left tackle as a senior. Gibson earned a B.S. Criminology in 2013, B.S. Psychology in 2014, and graduated from the Virginia Tech Police Academy.

Professional career

Dallas Cowboys
Gibson was drafted by the Dallas Cowboys in the seventh round (243rd overall) of the 2015 NFL Draft, because of his measurables and his impressive NFL scouting combine performance. He was a top performer in 4 out of 6 events at the combine. Posting a 5.04 second 40-yard dash, 33.5 inch vertical jump, 9 foot 5 inch broad jump, and a 4.56 second 20-yard shuttle. After suffering a broken finger during rookie mini-camp, the surgery and recovery caused him to miss the organized team activities and the team's mini-camp.

He was waived on September 5. The Cowboys offered him a chance to join their practice squad, but he decided to sign with a different team.

Kansas City Chiefs
On September 6, 2015, Gibson was signed by the Kansas City Chiefs to their practice squad. He spent the entire season on the team's practice squad and was signed to a futures contract on January 16, 2016. On May 10, he was released after rookie minicamp to make room for tryout offensive lineman Zach Sterup.

Atlanta Falcons
On May 18, 2016, Gibson was signed by the Atlanta Falcons. On September 3, 2016, he was waived by the Falcons due to final roster cuts.

Chicago Bears
On September 7, 2016, Gibson was signed to the Chicago Bears' practice squad. He was cut on September 13.

New York Giants
On September 21, 2016, Gibson was signed to the New York Giants' practice squad, because the team was experiencing a shortage of offensive linemen. On December 13, he was released by the team to make room for offensive lineman Adam Gettis.

Houston Texans
On December 14, 2016, Gibson was signed to the Houston Texans' practice squad. He signed a reserve/future contract with the Texans on January 16, 2017. He was waived on September 2, 2017.

Cleveland Browns
On December 13, 2017, Gibson was signed to the Cleveland Browns' practice squad.

New York Giants (second stint)
On January 9, 2018, Gibson signed a futures contract with the New York Giants.  He chose not to join the team for any of the voluntary off-season programs and subsequently he was waived on May 11, 2018.

Tennessee Titans
On August 3, 2018, Gibson signed with the Tennessee Titans. He was waived on September 1, 2018.

Personal life
In February 2017, Gibson along with former contractor for the U. S. Department of Defense at the Pentagon Joseph Bushrod, founded SolEnergy. SolEnergy is a residential and commercial solar panel installation company where Gibson sits as the active chief financial officer.

References

External links
Virginia Tech bio

1991 births
Living people
People from Sierra Vista, Arizona
Players of American football from Arizona
American football offensive tackles
Virginia Tech Hokies football players
Dallas Cowboys players
Kansas City Chiefs players
Atlanta Falcons players
Chicago Bears players
New York Giants players
Houston Texans players
Cleveland Browns players
Tennessee Titans players